The 2014–15 New Zealand Football Championship season (currently known as the ASB Premiership  for sponsorship reasons) was the eleventh season of the NZFC since its establishment in 2004. Nine teams are involved this season, which includes the newly formed Wellington Phoenix reserve team. Auckland City and Team Wellington will represent the ASB Premiership in the 2014–15 OFC Champions League after finishing Champions and Runners-up respectively in the 2013–14 competition.

Clubs

Kits

Regular season

League table

Positions by round

Fixtures and results
The 2014–15 season sees every team play the other both home and away. With the introduction of the Wellington Phoenix Reserves side creating an uneven number of teams, each team has two byes in the regular season. However, due to Auckland City FC's participation in the 2014 OFC President's Cup and the 2014 FIFA Club World Cup, several matches and byes have been rescheduled.

Round 4 (rescheduled)

Round 1

Bye:  Southern United

Round 8 (rescheduled)

Round 2

Round 6 (rescheduled)

Round 3

Bye:  Wellington Phoenix
Bye:  Canterbury United (rescheduled from Round 15)

Round 4

Bye:  Hawke's Bay United

Round 5

Bye:  WaiBOP United

Round 6

Bye:  Canterbury United

Round 7

Bye:  Auckland City FC

Round 8

Bye:  Team Wellington
Bye:  Waitakere United rescheduled from Round 2

Round 9

Bye:  Wanderers SC

Round 15 (rescheduled)

Round 10

Bye:  Southern United

Round 11

Bye:  Waitakere United

Round 12

Bye:  Wellington Phoenix

Round 13

Bye:  Hawke's Bay United

Round 14

Bye:  WaiBOP United

Round 2 (rescheduled)

Round 15

Bye:  Wanderers SC

Round 16

Bye:  Auckland City FC

Round 17

Bye:  Team Wellington

Round 18

Bye:  Wanderers SC

Finals series

Semi-finals first leg

Semi-finals second leg

Grand final

Statistics

Top Goal scorers

  

*Goals were scored in matches that were rescheduled.

Own goals

Discipline
The 'total' column is based on 1 point for a yellow card, 2 points for two yellows equalling red, and 3 points for a straight red card.
As of end of round 3, 16 November 2014

References

External links
 ASB Premiership website
 ASB Premiership Facebook page

New Zealand Football Championship seasons
1
New
New